Bitterfeld-Wolfen was a Verwaltungsgemeinschaft ("collective municipality") in the Anhalt-Bitterfeld district, in Saxony-Anhalt, Germany. The seat of the Verwaltungsgemeinschaft was in Bitterfeld-Wolfen. It was disbanded on 1 January 2010.

The Verwaltungsgemeinschaft Bitterfeld-Wolfen consisted of the following municipalities:

 Bitterfeld-Wolfen
 Friedersdorf
 Mühlbeck

References

Former Verwaltungsgemeinschaften in Saxony-Anhalt